Mathilde Johansson was the defending champion, and successfully defended her title, defeating Petra Cetkovská in the final, 7–5, 6–3.

Seeds

Main draw

Finals

Top half

Bottom half

References 
 Main draw
 Qualifying draw

ITF Roller Open - Singles
2011 in Luxembourgian tennis
ITF Roller Open